Thomas Coakley (born 21 May 1947) is a Scottish former football player and coach. Coakley, who played as a right winger, made 95 league appearances in a professional career which saw him play in Scotland, England, and the United States. After retiring as a player, Coakley became a football coach.

Playing career
Born in Bellshill, Coakley began his career with local side Bellshill Athletic, before making his debut in the Scottish Football League with Motherwell. Coakley later played in the Football League for Arsenal, and in the North American Soccer League for the Detroit Cougars, before returning to Scotland to play with Greenock Morton. In total, Coakley made 95 league appearances, scoring 10 goals. He then played for the Chelmsford City team that won the Southern League title in 1972.

Following the departure of Alan Skirton, Coakley became a mainstay of the Arsenal first team for the start of the 1966/67 season when he made 13 consecutive starts under new manager Bertie Mee. On Saturday 8 October 1966 Coakley made his final appearance in an Arsenal shirt in a 2–0 victory over Newcastle United at Highbury.

Managerial career
Coakley's management career began in the English non-league system, managing clubs including Maldon Town and Bishop's Stortford. When Alan Buckley was dismissed within 90 minutes of Third Division club Walsall being taken over by Terry Ramsden in the 1986 close season, Coakley was a surprise replacement. He led the club to an eighth-place finish in his first season, and promotion via the playoffs in 1988, but was dismissed in December 1988 after a ten-game losing streak.

After football
After an unsuccessful investment in betting shops, Coakley started a golf business with David Kelly, who had played for him at Walsall.

References

1947 births
Living people
Footballers from Bellshill
Association football wingers
Scottish footballers
Scottish football managers
Bellshill Athletic F.C. players
Detroit Cougars (soccer) players
Motherwell F.C. players
Arsenal F.C. players
Greenock Morton F.C. players
Chelmsford City F.C. players
Scottish Football League players
English Football League players
North American Soccer League (1968–1984) players
Southern Football League players
Walsall F.C. managers
English Football League managers
Scottish expatriate sportspeople in the United States
Expatriate soccer players in the United States
Scottish expatriate footballers